Peyer is a surname which may refer to:

 Craig Peyer (born 1950), former California Highway Patrol officer convicted of murdering Cara Knott
 Gervase de Peyer (1926–2017), English clarinettist and conductor
 Johann Baptist Peyer (c.1678–1733), Austrian organist and composer
 Johann Conrad Peyer (1653–1712), Swiss anatomist
 Károly Peyer (1881–1956), Hungarian politician
 Polly Peyer, retired U.S. Air Force general
 Tom Peyer (born 1954), American comic book creator and editor

See also
 Peyer's patches, aggregated lymphoid nodules named after Johann Conrad Peyer